The General Motors Le Sabre is a 1951 concept car. Possibly the most important show car of the 1950s, it introduced aircraft-inspired design elements such as the wrap-around windshield and tail fins, which became common on automotive designs during the second half of the decade.

History
The Le Sabre was the brainchild of General Motors Art Department head Harley Earl. The design was Earl's attempt to incorporate the look of modern jet fighter aircraft into automotive design. As jets replaced prop-driven aircraft in the late 1940s, they symbolized the very latest in design and engineering, and Earl had hoped to carry this concept into automobile design.

The project was a follow-up to Earl's famous 1938 Y-job. Like all his projects, it was built to be roadworthy, and became Earl's personal automobile for two years after finishing its tour of the auto show circuit. With a body made of aluminium, magnesium, and fiberglass, it was powered by a supercharged  V8 able to run on gasoline (petrol) or methanol (like Indy roadsters of the period did), and had an unusually-placed rear-mounted Buick Dynaflow automatic transmission. This was later changed to a GM Hydramatic. In addition to its jet inspired design, the 1951 Le Sabre also featured numerous advanced features, including a 12-volt electrical system (most cars of the period were 6-volt), heated seats, electric headlights concealed behind the center oval "jet intake", front bumper dagmars (later made famous on 1957-9 Cadillacs), a water sensor to activate the power top, and electric lifting jacks integral to the chassis to aid tire changes. (This idea would be copied decades later by Formula One race teams.)

The Le Sabre was GM's first use of a rear-mounted transmission, which would reappear in the Pontiac Tempest. It was also the first use of an aluminum-block 215 V8 , The same displacement would later appear in the Buick Special and Skylark, Oldsmobile Cutlass/F-85 and Jetfire, Pontiac Tempest and LeMans, and ultimately in numerous British marques, including Rover, Land Rover, Range Rover, Triumph, MG, and Morgan.

It was also GM's first use of the Le Sabre name, which would be adopted by Buick for a new line in 1959.

The Le Sabre concept car used a supercharged aluminum 215" V8 that was unique to the Le Sabre and the Buick XP300 concept cars. It was not the same engine later introduced in the early 1960s General Motors compact cars. The 1951 concept car 215" V8 engine had a bore of 3.3" and a stroke of 3.3"; what is known as a square engine bore to stroke ratio. The 1960s Buick and Olds-head equipped 215" V8 had an over-square design with a bore of 3.5" and stroke of 2.8". There are virtually no interchangeability in parts or design between the 1951 concept engines and the 1960s Buick/Olds 215" V8 engines, other than a common displacement. The 1960s Buick V8 engine was based on a new engine architecture that was increased in 1964 to 300" and shared internals with the Buick 225" V6. This engine architecture was the basis for further Buick small block V8s like the 340" and 350", and scaled upward to the big block Buick 400"-430"-455" family that replaced the famous Nailhead Buicks that were the first Buick V8s in 1953.

The concept 215" V8 used a hemispherical combustion chamber design, similar to early Chrysler V8s of the 1950s era. The later 1960s 215" V8 and first offshoot V8s like the 300" iron V8 also had hemispherical shaped combustion chambers. The 1964 300 continued the use of an aluminum head for that one year before switching to cast iron heads in 1965. Thin-wall casting technology and high nickel-content blocks allowed Buick to produce a strong engine block that was typically a hundred pounds or more lighter than the popular small block Chevy V8 and further removed the need to continue with the expensive aluminum castings.

It was the 1963 Buick aluminum 215 design and tooling that was purchased by British Leyland and used in a number of British cars, most notably the triumph TR-8 and the Land Rovers. A stock block 215 Buick ran and almost won the Indianapolis 500, and the Oldsmobile 215 engine blocks formed the basis of the Australian Formula One Repco V8 used by Brabham and won the Formula One Championship in 1966.

The 215" Buick V8 was also used in the very rare Italian-American Gran Turismo Apollo 3500GT in 1962-1963 as well as in the Asardo 3500 GM-S show car.

The Le Sabre is owned by the General Motors Heritage Museum, and still occasionally appears at car shows.

Reproductions
In 1999 the Franklin Mint introduced a 1:24 scale die cast reproduction on the 1951 Le Sabre. It became one of their best-selling automobile miniatures.
A smaller scale Le Sabre also exists as a Hot Wheels model.
Glencoe Models made a 1:72 scale plastic kit. Very simple kit and at rear wrong shape.
Berkley Models made a 1:24 scale kit with a body curved balsa wood.

References

Le Sabre
1950s cars